By the Grace of God is a formulaic phrase acknowledging fealty to God used especially by authority in historically Christian cultures to signify power granted by divine will.

By the Grace of God (Latin: Dei Gratia, abbreviated D.G.) may refer to:

 By the Grace of God (album), by the Hellacopters, 2002, and the title song
 By the Grace of God, by Hank Locklin, 2006
 "By the Grace of God" (song), by Katy Perry, 2013
 By the Grace of God (film), 2019

See also
 But for the Grace of God (disambiguation)
 "There by the Grace of God", a 2003 song by the Manic Street Preachers
 Dei Gratia (disambiguation)